The 1909 Coupe de Chamonix was the first edition of the Coupe de Chamonix, an international ice hockey tournament. It was held from January 23-25, 1909, in Chamonix, France. Princes Ice Hockey Club from Great Britain won the tournament.

Results

Final Table

References

External links
 Tournament on hockeyarchives.info

Coupe de Chamonix
Chamonix